Antonio Nariño Airport is an airport located in the town of Chachagüí and which serves the city of Pasto in the Nariño Department of Colombia. It handles only domestic flights in addition to military operations and private charters. A new terminal, administrative and tower control were built, also new navigation equipment was set up due to the increasing number of passengers and cargo flights. Usually Airbus 318, 319, 320, Boeing 737, 727, turboprop and different types of smaller aircraft use the airport

Runway
The airport has a table top runway, built on a plateau of 50 meters because of the surrounding terrain. Due to this, many pilots refer to the airport as an aircraft carrier. The runway is also relatively short for the elevation of the airport.

The position of the runway means that it is often rendered unusable, since in the presence of crosswinds, it prevents aircraft making a safe takeoff and landing. Crosswinds are common during the summer, particularly during the month of August.

Since 2007, the runway has been equipped with an instrument landing system (ILS), which permits airport operations during the night and when there is low visibility. However, a suitable place is being sought for to build a new airport due to the big increase in passengers and cargo and also since the current airport is often closed due to poor weather conditions.

Airlines and destinations

See also 
Transport in Colombia
List of airports in Colombia

References

External links 

Airports in Colombia
Buildings and structures in Nariño Department